is a UK insolvency law case concerning the administration procedure when a company is unable to repay its debts.

Facts
Mr Michael Oldham was appointed by the court as administrator of Mr Jack Kyrris’ partnership. Kyrris had operated 13 Burger King restaurants, including two on Angel Row and Upper Parliament Street, Nottingham. Mr Mario Royle was an employee who sought a secured equitable charge, granted by Kyrris, for work he had done, but had not yet been paid. This amounted to £270,000. A summary judgment was given to Mr Oldham, and Mr Royle cross appealed that Mr Oldham was in breach of a duty of care, and there was sufficient proximity to him were he an unsecured creditor. He said the failure to ensure sums were paid to him was a breach of duty.

Behrens J said the equitable charge point was good enough to go to trial, and gave summary judgment for Oldham on the duty of care point.

Judgment
Jonathan Parker LJ said that any equitable charge was a matter for trial and there was no sufficient proximity between administrators and unsecured creditors. The duty of an administrator is owed to the company, and no special duty was assumed. So under neither of the leading tort cases, Caparo v Dickman nor Henderson v Merrett, would the position differ. This was analogous to the company law case on directors' duties, Peskin v Anderson where Mummery LJ said that fiduciary duties are owed exclusively by directors to the company, and not to shareholders individually. Outside duties can arise, but ‘are dependent on establishing a special factual relationship between the directors and the shareholders in the particular case.’ He also noted Insolvency Act 1986, section 212, allowing the court to compel an administrator to repay money as the court thinks just, or contribute sums to the company’s assets for misfeasance, or beach of fiduciary duty or other duty as the court thinks just.

Dyson LJ and Thorpe LJ agreed.

See also

UK insolvency law

Notes

References
L Sealy and S Worthington, Cases and Materials in Company Law (8th edn OUP 2007) 635
R Goode, Principles of Corporate Insolvency Law (4th edn Sweet & Maxwell 2011)

United Kingdom insolvency case law
Court of Appeal (England and Wales) cases
2003 in British law
2003 in case law